The Hinojosa Site in Jim Wells County, Texas, in the vicinity of Alice, Texas, is an archeological site which was listed on the National Register of Historic Places in 1978.  It was listed for its potential to yield information in the future.

It is a village site which is also denoted as site 41-JW-8.

It is a site of the Toyah culture.

See also

National Register of Historic Places listings in Texas

References

Archaeological sites in Texas
National Register of Historic Places in Jim Wells County, Texas